Aurora Segura Lizuain (born 29 December 1923 in Navarra España) is a Mexican actress of the Golden Age of Mexican cinema.

Selected filmography 
 Full Speed Ahead (1951)
 The Masked Tiger (1951)
 The Island of Women (1953)
 The Player (1953)
 The Vagabond (1953)
 You've Got Me By the Wing (1957)

References

Bibliography 
 Rogelio Agrasánchez. Guillermo Calles: A Biography of the Actor and Mexican Cinema Pioneer. McFarland, 2010.

External links 
 

Year of birth unknown
Year of death unknown
Mexican film actresses